John (Jean) Iliopoulos (Greek: Ιωάννης Ηλιόπουλος; 1940, Kalamata, Greece) is a Greek physicist. He is the first person to present the Standard Model of particle physics in a single report. He is best known for his prediction of the charm quark with Sheldon Glashow and Luciano Maiani (the "GIM mechanism"). Iliopoulos is also known for demonstrating the cancellation of anomalies in the Standard model. He is further known for the Fayet-Iliopoulos D-term formula, which was introduced in 1974.  He is currently an honorary member of Laboratory of theoretical physics of École Normale Supérieure, Paris.

Biography

Iliopoulos graduated from National Technical University of Athens (NTUA) in 1962 as a Mechanical-Electrical Engineer.  He continued his studies in the field of Theoretical Physics in University of Paris, and in 1963 he obtained the D.E.A, in 1965 the Doctorat 3e Cycle, and in 1968 the Doctorat d' Etat titles. Between the years 1966 and 1968 he was a scholar at CERN, Geneva. From 1969 till 1971 he was a Research Associate in Harvard University. In 1971 he returned in Paris and began working at CNRS. He also held the director position of the Laboratory of Theoretical Physics of Ecole Normale Superieure between the years 1991-1995 and 1998-2002. In 2002, Iliopoulos was the first recipient of the Aristeio prize, which has been instituted to recognize Greeks who have made significant contributions towards furthering their chosen fields of science. Iliopoulos and Maiani were jointly awarded the 1987 Sakurai Prize for theoretical particle physics. In 2007 Iliopoulos and Maiani received the Dirac Medal of the ICTP "(f)or their work on the physics of the charm quark, a major contribution to the birth of the Standard Model, the modern theory of Elementary Particles."

Scientific work 
Iliopoulos is a specialist in high energy theoretical physics and elementary particle physics. In 1970, in collaboration with Sheldon Glashow and Luciano Maïani, he introduced the so-called "GIM mechanism" (named after the three authors) which is an essential element of the theory of fundamental interactions known as the "Standard Model ". This mechanism postulates the existence of a new elementary particle, the "charmed" quark, a prediction that was confirmed by experience. In 1972, in collaboration with Claude Bouchiat and Philippe Meyer, he demonstrated that the mathematical coherence of the Standard Model requires symmetry between the elementary constituents of matter, namely quarks (which form hadrons such as proton and neutron) and leptons (such as electron, muon and neutrinos). This symmetry is also verified experimentally.

Iliopoulos was one of the pioneers of supersymetry, the hypothetical symmetry that links fermions and bosons. He showed that it has remarkable convergence properties and, in collaboration with P. Fayet, he proposed a mechanism that leads to its spontaneous breakage. He also studied some aspects of the quantum theory of gravitation as well as the mathematical properties of invariant gauge theories formulated in a non-commutative geometric space.

Most significant publications 
 
 
 
 
 
 
 
 
 J. Iliopoulos, Aux origines de la masse, EDP Sciences (2015)
 L. Baulieu, J. Iliopoulos, R. Sénéor, From Classical to Quantum Fields, Oxford University Press (2017)
 Theodore N. Tomaras, John Iliopoulos, Elementary Particle Physics - The Standard Theory, Oxford University Press (2021)

Awards

1978 Paul Langevin Prize of the French Physical Society
 1980 Corresponding Member, Academy of Athens, Greece
1984 Jean Ricard Prize of the French Physical Society
1987 Sakurai Prize of the American Physical Society
1990 / 2002 Corresponding / Full Member of the French Academy of Sciences
1996 Doctor honoris causa, Université de la Méditerranée, Aix-Marseille, France
1999 Doctor honoris causa, University of Crete, Greece 
2002 Doctor honoris causa, University of Ioannina, Greece 
2002 Doctor honoris causa, University of Athens, Greece 
2002 Bodossaki Prize
2005 Matteucci Medal, Accademia Nazionale delle Scienze, detta dei XL
2007 Dirac Medal, Abdus Salam International Centre for Theoretical Physics, Trieste, Italy
2011 High Energy Physics Prize, European Physical Society
2013 Three Physicists Prize, Ecole Normale Supérieure, France

See also
GIM mechanism

References

 

1940 births
Living people
20th-century Greek physicists
Theoretical physicists
University of Paris alumni
National Technical University of Athens alumni
Academic staff of the École Normale Supérieure
Harvard University faculty
People associated with CERN
Members of the French Academy of Sciences
Corresponding Members of the Academy of Athens (modern)
J. J. Sakurai Prize for Theoretical Particle Physics recipients
Recipients of the Matteucci Medal
Scientists from Kalamata
Greek emigrants to France